The Stedman barb (Systomus clavatus) is a species of cyprinid fish native to India and Bangladesh in the Ganges River basin where it occurs in foothill streams and rivers.  This species can reach a length of  TL.  It is of minor importance to local commercial fisheries.

References

Systomus
Fish of Bangladesh
Freshwater fish of India
Fish described in 1845
Taxobox binomials not recognized by IUCN